Sen Sen (also Romanized as Sansen; also known as Sinsin) is a village in Miyandasht Rural District, in the Central District of Kashan County, Isfahan Province, Iran. At the 2006 census, its population was 1,576, in 411 families.

References 

Populated places in Kashan County